Coptosia drurei is a species of beetle in the family Cerambycidae. It was described by Maurice Pic in 1909, originally under the genus Phytoecia.

References

Saperdini
Beetles described in 1909